The 2017–18 Jacksonville State Gamecocks men's basketball team represented Jacksonville State University during the 2017–18 NCAA Division I men's basketball season. The Gamecocks, led by second-year head coach Ray Harper, played their home games at the Pete Mathews Coliseum in Jacksonville, Alabama as members of the Ohio Valley Conference. They finished the season 23–13, 11–7 in OVC play to finish in fourth place. They defeated Tennessee Tech in the quarterfinals of the OVC tournament before losing in the semifinals to Murray State. They were invited to the College Basketball Invitational where they defeated Canisius and Central Arkansas to advance to the semifinals where they lost to North Texas.

Previous season 
The Gamecocks finished the 2016–17 season 20–15, 9–7 in OVC play to finish in third place in the East Division. As the No. 4 seed in the OVC tournament, they defeated Southeast Missouri State, top-seeded Belmont, and UT Martin to win the tournament title. As a result, they received the conference's automatic bid to the NCAA tournament, its first ever appearance, where it lost in the first round to Louisville.

Preseason 
In a vote of conference coaches and sports information directors, Jacksonville State was picked to finish in 2nd place in the OVC. Malcolm Drumwright and Norbertas Giga were named to the 2017–18 Preseason All-OVC Men's Basketball Team.

After five years of divisional play in the OVC, the conference eliminated divisions for the 2017–18 season. Additionally, for the first time, each conference team will play 18 conference games.

Roster

Schedule and results

|-
!colspan=9 style=| Exhibition

|-
!colspan=9 style=| Non-conference regular season

|-
!colspan=9 style=| Ohio Valley Conference regular season

|-
!colspan=9 style=| Ohio Valley Conference tournament

|-
!colspan=9 style=| CBI

References

Jacksonville State Gamecocks men's basketball seasons
Jacksonville State
Jacksonville State
Jacksonville State
Jacksonville State